Albionbatrachus is an extinct genus of prehistoric frogs from England and Romania. Two species are recognized: While previously synonymised with Palaeobatrachus, it is now considered a distinct palaeobatrachid genus based on characters of the frontoparietals.
Albionbatrachus oligocenicus
Albionbatrachus wightensis

See also
 Prehistoric amphibian
 List of prehistoric amphibians

References

Prehistoric amphibian genera
Oligocene amphibians
Cenozoic amphibians of Europe
Fossil taxa described in 1984
Mesobatrachia